Bøe is a Norwegian surname. Notable people with the surname include:
 
Anette Bøe (born 1957), Norwegian cross-country skier
Gunvald Bøe (1904–1967), Norwegian historian 
Gunnar Bøe (1917–1989), Norwegian politician 
Alf Bøe (1927–2010), Norwegian art historian 
Eirik Glambek Bøe (born 1975), Norwegian musician 
Frants Diderik Bøe (1820–1891), Norwegian painter 
Anne Bøe (born 1956), Norwegian poet 
Christine Bøe Jensen (born 1975), Norwegian footballer 
Ragnar Bøe Elgsaas (born 1971), Norwegian politician 
Johannes A. Bøe (1882–1970), Norwegian politician 
Johannes P. Bøe (1774–1859), Norwegian politician 

Norwegian-language surnames